"Young & Gettin' It" is a song by American rapper Meek Mill from his debut studio album, Dreams and Nightmares (2012). The song features a guest appearance from fellow rapper Kirko Bangz. It was produced by Jahlil Beats, who served as a co-writer with the rappers and Vincent Robinson. On September 19, 2012, the song was released as the third single from the album, through Maybach Music Group and Warner Bros. Records. A club-influenced track with Auto-Tune usage from Mill and Kirko Bangz, it sees the former celebrating his successes.

"Young & Gettin' It" received mixed reviews from music critics, who were divided in their assessments of the subject matter. Its composition garnered some praise, though the auto-tune usage was often criticized. In the United States, the song charted at number 86 on the Billboard Hot 100, while reaching
number 25 on the Hot R&B/Hip-Hop Songs chart. It was certified gold in the country by the Recording Industry Association of America (RIAA). An accompanying music video was released on October 28, 2012, which shows Mill partying with Kirko Bangz on a yacht and them venturing into Miami. In November 2012, the song was performed live by the rappers and the Roots on Late Night with Jimmy Fallon, with contributions from Funkmaster Flex.

Background and composition

"Young & Gettin' It" was solely produced by record producer Jahlil Beats, who had frequently handled this duty for Mill. The song was written by Mill, the producer, Kirko Bangz, and Vincent Robinson. Jahlil Beats was first introduced to the rapper over Myspace, and contributed productions to his mixtapes Flamers 2: Hottest In Tha City (2009) and Dreamchasers 2 (2012). The song marked Mill's first instance of using Auto-Tune.

Musically, "Young & Gettin' It" is a club-influenced track. Throughout the song, Mill raps in his usual high pitch, while both him and Kirko Bangz deploy auto-tune. In the lyrics of the song, Mill celebrates his fame and wealth. He also touches on the strength to sell drugs. Kirko Bangz sings the hook, contributing his signature melodies. Mill uses certain lyrics to boast of his lifestyle, such as "These niggas claimin' they ballin'/ I take your bitch, Kris Humphries".

Release and reception
On September 19, 2012, the song was released as the album's third single and the first one not from any of Mill's mixtapes. It was successful on radio stations in the United States. "Young & Gettin' It" was later included as the third track of Mill's debut studio album Dreams and Nightmares on October 30. The song was met with mixed reviews from music critics, with split feelings of its subject matter. Rap-Up author Devin wrote that Mill "stacks his paper and lives it up on the carefree anthem", while Ghøst of OnSmash predicted it to become an "anthem for all the youngins ... com[ing] up making that money, straight hustler music". Writing for AllMusic, David Jeffries similarly called it a "hooky swagger anthem". At Stereogum, Corban Goble described the song as "a radio-aiming jam".

In a mixed review, the staff of XXL assumed that the song lacks Mill's lyrical dedication from the Maybach compilations and his Dreamchasers mixtape series of the early 2010s, noting he delivers "aimless lines". The staff wrote off Mill's usage of auto-tune and concluded that the song remains "as a guilty pleasure, but nonetheless stands as a lowbrow moment". Reviewing for the Vibe daily list of September 19, 2012, Keenan Higgins was particularly disappointed with the auto-tune and said that "Young & Gettin' It" seems "annoying rather than enjoyable", yet acknowledged its club appeal. PopMatters editor Matthew Fiander assured that the song is one of the album's "safe choices", believing "you're bound to get ear fatigue" by repeatedly listening to the subjects of money and drugs. Spins Mosi Reeves felt that "Kirko Bangz hijacks 'Young & Gettin' It'", contributing a basic imitation of Canadian musician Drake. In a highly negative review, EOrtiz from HipHopDX thought the song pales in comparison to Mill's successes, singling out its "aimless rhymes and an insufferable hook from Kirko Bangz".

Commercial performance
"Young & Gettin' It" debuted at number 95 on the US Billboard Hot 100 for the issue date of November 10, 2012. It left the Hot 100 the following week, before re-appearing at number 92 on the chart issue dated November 24. The track fell down four places to number 96 on the Hot 100 the next week, yet later peaked at number 86 on the chart for January 12, 2013. It lasted for 10 weeks on the Hot 100.

The song entered the US Hot R&B/Hip-Hop Songs chart at number 72 for the issue dated October 6, 2012, and jumped 11 places to number 61 the following week. On the issue date of November 10, the track peaked at number 25 on the chart, which it spent 19 weeks on. The track further reached number 18 on the US Hot Rap Songs chart. On July 20, 2017, "Young & Gettin' It" was awarded a gold certification by the Recording Industry Association of America (RIAA) for pushing 500,000 certified units in the US.

Music video and promotion

On September 28, 2012, the song's music video was shot in Miami by Dre Films. The music video premiered via MTV on October 28. At the beginning, Mill and Kirko Bangz showcase their jewelry and footwear, respectively. The two then party with semi-naked women on a yacht, where Mill flaunts his money. They are shown by beaches and riding speedboats, before the scene transitions to Miami. There, Mill drives around in a Rolls-Royce car, while Kirko Bangz uses a Ferrari. The rappers arrive at a craps table and roll the dice, which is followed by them opening champagne bottles at a club. For the conclusion, this scene transitions back to the yacht partying.

At the 2012 BET Hip Hop Awards, Mill transitioned into a performance of the song from fellow Dreams and Nightmares single "Amen", bringing out Kirko Bangz. Flames erupted on stage for the start of it and Mill wore a black sweater with leather sleeves, sunglasses, and various jewelry items, including a jesus piece. On November 12, 2012, Mill and Kirko Bangz performed an acoustic-tinged version of "Young & Gettin' It" on Late Night with Jimmy Fallon with the house band the Roots. The performance marked Mill's debut on the show and for the hook, DJ Funkmaster Flex contributed scratches.

Credits and personnel
Information taken from Dreams and Nightmares liner notes.

Mastering
 Mastered at Chris Athens Masters, Austin, TX and WEA Studios, Burbank, CA

Personnel
 Meek Mill songwriter
 Jahlil Beats songwriter, producer
 Kirk Randle songwriter
 Vincent Robinson songwriter
 Chris Athens mastering
 Justin Smith mastering

Charts

Certifications

References

2012 singles
2012 songs
Kirko Bangz songs
Maybach Music Group singles
Meek Mill songs
Song recordings produced by Jahlil Beats
Songs written by Jahlil Beats
Songs written by Meek Mill